Parsa Bazar पर्साबजार is a town situated in 18  km east of Bharatpur, in Chitwan District, Nepal. It is central part of the country and directly connected with Mahendra Highway  in Khairahani Municipality. It has population of about 65,000, and is one of the major marketing centre for the people residing in eastern part of the district Chitwan. The town offers a quality education and various shops. Migration from the villages making the town more crowded lately. Real states seems to be expensive comparing to some other places in chitwan district. Parsa is divided in two parts by a river Pamfa where southern part is known as old Parsa and northern parts is new Parsa. It is also the hometown of talented musician Daya sibakoti, who has studied music from universities in different countries. He is well known in chitwan for his writing skills and great stage performances, who also organizes the cultural events and active social worker. His debut music video Keti Ohhh <ref>https://www.youtube.com/watch?v=XsWMKZJpw_U , was a big hit in Chitwan in 2013 and 2014.

Notes

Populated places in Chitwan District